The Embassy of Ukraine in Paris is the diplomatic mission of Ukraine in France.

History 

France recognised the independence of Ukraine on December 27, 1991.  Diplomatic relations were established on January 24, 1992. Following independence, Ukraine opened its embassy in Paris in 1993.

Consulates 

Besides the Consulate of the Paris embassy, Ukraine has a consulate in Marseille and honorary consulates in Metz, Lyon, Nevers and Toulouse.

List of ambassadors
 1992 Oleksandr Slipchenko, Chargé d'Affaires ad interim
 1992–1997 Yuri Kochubey, Ambassador
 1997–2000 Anatoliy Zlenko, Ambassador
 2000–2003 Vitaly Yohna, Chargé d'Affaires ad interim
 2003–2007 Yuriy A. Sergeyev, Ambassador
 2007–2010 Kostiantyn Tymochenko, Ambassador
 2010–2014 Oleksandr Kupchyshyn, Ambassador
 since 2014 Oleh Shamshur, Ambassador

See also 
 France–Ukraine relations
 Foreign relations of France
 Foreign relations of Ukraine
 Embassy of France, Kiev
 Diplomatic missions of Ukraine

References

External links 

 (Ukrainian) Official website Embassy of Ukraine, Paris

France–Ukraine relations
Paris
Ukraine